Trichonida Province was one of the provinces of the Aetolia-Acarnania Prefecture, Greece. Its territory corresponded with that of the current municipalities Agrinio (except the municipal units Angelokastro, Arakynthos, Makryneia and Stratos) and Thermo. It was abolished in 2006.

References

Provinces of Greece